The FA Selangor League is the state-level football league in Selangor. It is one of the 23 other concurrent fourth-tier level leagues in the Malaysian football league system and a fifth to seventh-tier league in the national level. The league is managed by the Football Association of Selangor (FAS). The league was established a long time ago where the earliest known records was in 1935.

The league has undergone multiple iterations of structures until its current structure took place. The current top-tier division in the FA Selangor League is the FA Selangor Super League, followed by the second-tier FA Selangor Premier League, the third-tier FA Selangor Division 1 and the fourth-tier FA Selangor League Division 2 which forms the four-division league structure.

History

Origin
The Selangor Football League or FA Selangor League has been held for a long time. The league started as the Selangor Amateur Football League in 1905. The first known records of the league was in 1935 where the champion for that year were Rangers.

Even though the league was relatively unknown to outsiders, the Selangor state has been a source of clubs for the national league for years. Some of the recent teams from Selangor that are currently or have competed in the national-tier league are PKNS and Megah Murni among others.

Competition

Men 
Starting from 2019, The FA Selangor League consists of competitions run and organised by Football Association of Selangor in collaboration with Football Selangor which are listed below:

 FAS Super League
 FAS Premier League
 FAS League Division 1
 FAS League Division 2
 FAS FA Cup
 FAS Charity Shield

Starting from 2022, the structure of the league competition is as below:

Women 
Starting from 2021, The FA Selangor League consists of competitions run and organised by Football Association of Selangor in collaboration with Football Selangor which are listed below:

 FAS Women's Super League

Starting from 2021, the structure of the league competition is as below:

FAS Super League

List of FAS Super League finals

Result by club

Awards

FAS Premier League

List of FAS Premier League finals

Result by club

Awards

FAS League Division 1

List of FAS League Division 1 finals

Result by club

Awards

FAS League Division 2

List of FAS League Division 2 finals

Result by club

Awards

References

External links

FAS League

Selangor FA
4